Lamak Mahalleh-ye Lafmejan (also Romanized as Lamak Maḩalleh-ye Lafmejān) is a village in Lafmejan Rural District, in the Central District of Lahijan County, Gilan Province, Iran. At the 2006 census, its population was 140, in 50 families.

References 

Populated places in Lahijan County